
Gmina Dzierzgowo is a rural gmina (administrative district) in Mława County, Masovian Voivodeship, in east-central Poland.

Villages
Gmina Dzierzgowo contains the villages and settlements of Brzozowo-Czary, Brzozowo-Dąbrówka, Brzozowo-Łęg, Brzozowo-Maje, Brzozowo-Utraty, Choszczewka, Dobrogosty, Dzierzgówek, Dzierzgowo, Kamień, Kitki, Kolonia Choszczewka, Kostusin, Krery, Kurki, Międzyleś, Nowe Brzozowo, Nowe Łączyno, Pęcherze, Pobodze, Rogale, Ruda, Rzęgnowo, Sosnówka, Stare Brzozowo, Stare Łączyno, Stegna, Szpaki, Szumsk, Szumsk-Sodowo, Tańsk-Chorąże, Tańsk-Grzymki, Tańsk-Kęsocha, Tańsk-Kiernozy, Tańsk-Przedbory, Tańsk-Umiotki, Wasiły, Wydrzywilk, Żaboklik and Zawady.

Neighbouring gminas
Gmina Dzierzgowo is bordered by the gminas of Chorzele, Czernice Borowe, Grudusk, Janowiec Kościelny, Janowo, Krzynowłoga Mała, Szydłowo and Wieczfnia Kościelna.

References

Polish official population figures 2006

Dzierzgowo
Mława County